Karchan (also Romanized as Kārchān; also known as Kārchon and Kharshān) is a city in the Central District of Arak County, Markazi Province, Iran. At the 2006 census, its population was 3,530, in 964 families.  It was promoted to city status in 2009.

References 

Populated places in Arak County

Cities in Markazi Province